Francis Marion University Observatory  is an astronomical observatory owned and operated by Francis Marion University.  Built in 1982, it is located in Florence, South Carolina (US).

See also
 List of observatories

References

External links
Francis Marion University Observatory Clear Sky Clock Forecasts of observing conditions.

Astronomical observatories in South Carolina
Buildings and structures in Florence County, South Carolina